The Latvian Football Cup is the main knockout cup competition in Latvian football. Since 2021, its full name is Responsible Gaming Latvian Football Cup (Atbildīgas spēles Latvijas kauss) due to the sponsorship by sports betting company William Hill. The tournament was launched in 1937, replacing the previous knockout tournament – the Riga Football Cup.

The competition is a knockout (single elimination) tournament. From 1937 to 2008 and again since 2017, all of the games of the tournament are played within the year.

During the Soviet occupation (1940–1941, 1944–1991) it served as a qualification tournament for the Soviet Cup. The competition was also fully played once during the German occupation of the Baltic states, in 1943.

List of finals
The results of the finals are:

Total titles won
The following 34 clubs have won the Latvian Football Cup.

 Bold clubs play in top flight.
 Italic clubs dissolved or merged.

References

External links
Official website
Cup at uefa.com
Cup at soccerway.com
 League321.com - National cup results. 

 
Latvia
1